Robert M. Gantt Jr. (June 22, 1922 – October 25, 1994) was an American professional basketball player. He played for one season with the Washington Capitols of the Basketball Association of America during the 1946–47 season. Gantt played college basketball for Duke University. He is a member of the North Carolina Sports Hall of Fame.

BAA career statistics

Regular season

Playoffs

References

External links
 Duke Athletic HOF profile 

1922 births
1994 deaths
American football ends
American men's basketball players
Centers (basketball)
Forwards (basketball)
Duke Blue Devils football players
Duke Blue Devils men's basketball players
Duke Blue Devils men's track and field athletes
Washington Capitols players
Sportspeople from Durham, North Carolina
Players of American football from North Carolina
Basketball players from North Carolina
Track and field athletes from North Carolina